Michał Kwiatkowski (born 2 June 1990) is a Polish professional road bicycle racer, who currently rides for UCI WorldTeam .

Kwiatkowski is seen as a strong all rounder, with good sprinting, time-trialling and climbing abilities allowing him to win both stage races and one day classics. His talent was shown early in his career, winning the World Junior Time Trial Championships in 2008. In 2014, Kwiatkowski became the world elite road race champion, and he was also a member of the  team that won the 2013 World Team Time Trial Championships. In 2017 he won his first 'Monument', Milan–San Remo, while in 2018, he won Tirreno–Adriatico and the Tour de Pologne. He is a two-time winner of two of the most prestigious non-Monument classics, the Amstel Gold Race and the Strade Bianche.

Career

Early career 
Kwiatkowski is a double European junior champion, winning the road race in 2007 and the individual time trial in 2008. In 2009 he became national road champion in the under-23 category, and he also won a stage of the Okolo Slovenska.

Omega Pharma–Quick Step (2012–2015)

2012 
He impressed in his first year with the team, winning the prologue of the Driedaagse van West-Vlaanderen. He also finished second overall in his home race, the Tour de Pologne, and eighth overall in the Eneco Tour.

2013 

Kwiatkowski began the 2013 season in excellent form, placing second overall in the Volta ao Algarve. He then finished fourth overall in Tirreno–Adriatico, and won the young rider classification, after proving one of the strongest climbers in the race. He finished fourth at the summit finish of Prati di Tivo to take the overall race lead from team-mate Mark Cavendish, before surrendering it the next day. Kwiatkowski then rode a strong classics campaign, placing fourth in the Amstel Gold Race and fifth in La Flèche Wallonne. In June, he won the senior National Road Race Championships for the first time.

Kwiatkowski's excellent form saw him selected to ride the Tour de France. He wore the white jersey – of young rider classification leader – in the first week after coming third on Stage 2 and fourth on Stage 3, both reduced bunch sprints. On Stage 7 he came in fourth again. On Stage 9 (a high mountain stage) he reached the podium once again. With a strong time trial, he was able to regain the white jersey of the young rider classification on Stage 11, but lost the lead shortly after to Nairo Quintana. Even though he lost the white jersey, he still managed to finish 11th in his Tour debut.

2014 

In 2014, Kwiatkowski won the Italian Classic Strade Bianche. He placed on the third step of the podium in Liège–Bastogne–Liège as well as in La Flèche Wallonne and fifth in the Amstel Gold Race.

In September, he grabbed the leader's jersey of the Tour of Britain by winning the fourth stage in a select group sprint of 6 riders. Overall he placed second in the general classification and first in the points classification.

Later that same month he became the first Polish cyclist to win the UCI Road Race World Championships. Despite a late chase, he was able to hold the lead and coast across the finish line, winning the rainbow jersey. After the race, Kwiatkowski posted his winning ride on Strava, which helped determine his statistics for the event. He climbed  and burned  during the course of 6:29:45, producing an average power of 240 watts with an average heartbeat of 148 beats per minute. He rode his first race in the rainbow jersey at Il Lombardia and finished 77th.

2015 

Being reigning world champion, Kwiatkowski tended to start the 2015 year with a less aggressive approach than 2014 for the bigger race later on in the year. He used the Volta ao Algarve and Paris–Nice as warm up races to prepare for the classics campaign, finishing second overall in both events. In April, Kwiatkowski earned a prestigious victory at the Amstel Gold Race. After the last climb of the Cauberg, he had to work to join a small group led by Philippe Gilbert. Before the finish line, a regrouping of about fifteen riders formed and Kwiatkowski outsprinted them to add the Dutch classic to his palmarès.

He abandoned the 2015 Tour de France during Stage 17.

Team Sky / Team Ineos (2016–present)

2016 
On 27 September 2015,  announced the signing of Kwiatkowski for the 2016 season.

On 25 March 2016, Kwiatkowski won his first cobbled classic, E3 Harelbeke, by outsprinting Peter Sagan after the pair broke away from an elite group with  remaining. He was named in the startlist for the Vuelta a España, After Team Sky won the opening time trial, Kwiatkowski took the race leader's red jersey after finishing fourth on stage 2. However, he lost the race lead to the 's Rubén Fernández the following day, and abandoned on stage 7 with a back injury. This marked a culmination of a difficult season for Kwiatkowski, after illnesses earlier in the year had wrecked his Ardennes classics campaign and led to him missing out on selection for the Tour de France.

2017 

On 4 March 2017, Kwiatkowski won the Strade Bianche after attacking from a group of four race favourites with around  remaining and he was able to solo away to the race victory in Siena. By doing so, he became the second rider, after Fabian Cancellara, to win multiple editions of the race. Later that month, Kwiatkowski won Milan–San Remo in a three-up sprint finish ahead of world champion Peter Sagan and  rider Julian Alaphilippe after the trio broke clear on the race's final climb – the Poggio di San Remo. This was his first victory on one of the Monuments. On 16 April, Kwiatkowski took second place in the Amstel Gold Race after being defeated by Philippe Gilbert in a two-up sprint finish.

He was selected for Sky's Tour de France squad thanks to his recent successes, fulfilling his goal since joining the team of getting to ride the Tour with team leader Chris Froome. He finished 8th on the opening stage in Düsseldorf as well as 2nd in the final time trial in Marseille. However, it was his selfless efforts in support of Froome that gained him much praise from fans and media as a "super-domestique", especially shown on stage 14 to Rodez where he set up his team leader perfectly for the final run-in and on stage 15 to Le Puy-en-Velay, surrendering his back wheel to Froome when he had a mechanical on the ascent of the Col de Peyra Talliade. On 29 July he won Clásica de San Sebastián, outsprinting Tony Gallopin, Bauke Mollema, Tom Dumoulin and teammate Mikel Landa in a five-man sprint finish.

2018
At the Volta ao Algarve in February 2018, Kwiatkowski, whilst sitting second overall behind teammate Geraint Thomas, was part of a 31-man breakaway which went clear in the opening kilometres of the final stage. Kwiatkowski held on to win the stage on the Malhão to take overall victory by 1 minute 31 seconds over Thomas. In March, Kwiatkowski again took a leader's jersey from Thomas on the fourth stage at Tirreno–Adriatico. Thomas suffered a mechanical issue  from the summit of the final climb to Sarnano–Sassotetto, that resulted in him losing 34 seconds and the overall leader's blue jersey to Kwiatkowski. Kwiatkowski held on to win the race overall. One week after the Tour de France, in early August, Kwiatkowski rode his home race, the Tour de Pologne. He won stage 4, with a steep uphill finish in Szczyrk, and successfully defended his lead in the following stages to win the race overall.

Career achievements

Major results

2007
 UEC European Junior Road Championships
1st  Road race
2nd  Time trial
 1st  Overall Course de la Paix Juniors
1st Points classification
1st Young rider classification
1st Stage 1
 10th Overall Giro della Lunigiana
1st Stage 2
2008
 1st  Time trial, UCI Junior World Championships
 UEC European Junior Road Championships
1st  Time trial
9th Road race
 1st  Overall Trofeo Karlsberg
1st Stage 1
 1st  Overall Course de la Paix Juniors
2009
 1st  Road race, National Under-23 Road Championships
 1st Stage 2 Okolo Slovenska
 4th Memoriał Henryka Łasaka
 4th Gran Premio della Liberazione
 7th Giro del Mendrisiotto
 10th Trofeo Edil C
 10th Coupe des Carpathes
2010
 4th Overall Szlakiem Grodów Piastowskich
 7th Overall Volta ao Alentejo
 10th Gran Premio de Llodio
2011
 3rd Overall Driedaagse van West-Vlaanderen
 3rd Overall Three Days of De Panne
 3rd Overall Tour du Poitou-Charentes
 6th Grand Prix de Wallonie
2012
 1st Prologue Driedaagse van West-Vlaanderen
 2nd Time trial, National Road Championships
 2nd Overall Tour de Pologne
 8th Overall Eneco Tour
2013
 1st  Team time trial, UCI Road World Championships
 National Road Championships
1st  Road race
2nd Time trial
 2nd Overall Volta ao Algarve
 4th Overall Tirreno–Adriatico
1st  Young rider classification
1st Stage 1 (TTT)
 4th Amstel Gold Race
 5th La Flèche Wallonne
 5th Grand Prix de Wallonie
 Tour de France
Held  after Stages 2–7 & 11–14
2014
 UCI Road World Championships
1st  Road race
3rd  Team time trial
 1st  Time trial, National Road Championships
 1st  Overall Volta ao Algarve
1st Stages 2 & 3 (ITT)
 1st Trofeo Serra de Tramuntana
 1st Strade Bianche
 1st Prologue Tour de Romandie
 1st Stage 1 (TTT) Tirreno–Adriatico
 2nd Overall Tour of Britain
1st  Points classification
1st Stage 4
 2nd Overall Tour of the Basque Country
1st  Points classification
 3rd La Flèche Wallonne
 3rd Liège–Bastogne–Liège
 5th Amstel Gold Race
 7th Trofeo Ses Salines
 Tour de France
Held  after Stages 8–9
2015
 1st Amstel Gold Race
 UCI Road World Championships
2nd  Team time trial
8th Road race
 2nd Overall Paris–Nice
1st  Young rider classification
1st Prologue
 2nd Overall Volta ao Algarve
 4th Dwars door Vlaanderen
 8th Overall Tour of the Basque Country
 Tour de France
 Combativity award Stages 2 & 12
2016
 1st E3 Harelbeke
 Vuelta a España
1st Stage 1 (TTT)
Held  after Stage 2
 2nd Trofeo Pollenca-Port de Andratx
 2nd Trofeo Serra de Tramuntana
 8th Overall Tirreno–Adriatico
2017
 1st  Time trial, National Road Championships
 1st Milan–San Remo
 1st Clásica de San Sebastián
 1st Strade Bianche
 2nd Overall Volta ao Algarve
 2nd Amstel Gold Race
 3rd  Team time trial, UCI Road World Championships
 3rd Liège–Bastogne–Liège
 5th Overall Tour of Britain
 6th UCI World Tour
 7th La Flèche Wallonne
2018
 National Road Championships
1st  Road race
3rd Time trial
 1st  Overall Tirreno–Adriatico
 1st  Overall Tour de Pologne
1st  Points classification
1st Stages 4 & 5
 1st  Overall Volta ao Algarve
1st  Points classification
1st Stages 2 & 5
 Critérium du Dauphiné
1st Prologue & Stage 3 (TTT)
 4th Time trial, UCI Road World Championships
 Vuelta a España
Held  after Stages 2–4
Held  after Stages 2–6
Held  after Stages 2–4 & 6
 Combativity award Stage 14
2019
 3rd Overall Paris–Nice
1st  Points classification
 3rd Milan–San Remo
 4th Time trial, National Road Championships
 10th Overall UAE Tour
2020
 1st Stage 18 Tour de France
 4th Road race, UCI Road World Championships
 4th Gran Trittico Lombardo
 6th La Flèche Wallonne
 6th Brabantse Pijl
 10th Liège–Bastogne–Liège
2021
 1st Stage 3 (TTT) Tour of Britain
 2nd Overall Étoile de Bessèges
 3rd Overall Tour de Pologne
 8th Amstel Gold Race
2022
 1st Amstel Gold Race

General classification results timeline

Classics results timeline

Major championships timeline

Awards
 International Flandrien of the Year: 2014
 Gold Cross of Merit (Krzyż Zasługi): 2014

References

External links

 
 
 
 

1990 births
Living people
Cyclists at the 2012 Summer Olympics
Cyclists at the 2016 Summer Olympics
Cyclists at the 2020 Summer Olympics
Polish Tour de France stage winners
Olympic cyclists of Poland
People from Chełmża
Polish male cyclists
Sportspeople from Kuyavian-Pomeranian Voivodeship
UCI Road World Champions (elite men)
21st-century Polish people
20th-century Polish people